Arthur Hunnewell Bowditch (May 12, 1870 in Boston – May 13, 1941 in Brookline) was an architect.

Early life
His parents were Charles Albert Bowditch and his wife Emma Frances Hunnewell.  On June 1, 1893, he married Alice DeWitt Foster.

Notable projects
360 Newbury Street, Boston, Massachusetts
Noyes-Buck Building
Paramount Theatre (Boston, Massachusetts), (“the last great movie palace built downtown”)
Publicity Building
Myles Standish Hotel, now a dormitory at Boston University

References

19th-century American architects
1870 births
1941 deaths
20th-century American architects